Chungara–Tambo Quemado is a mountain pass through the Cordillera Occidental of the Andes along the border between Chile and Bolivia.  Chungara–Tambo Quemado is one of the principal Chile-Bolivia passes in the central Andes as it connects La Paz with its nearest seaport Arica.

See also 

 K'isi K'isini
 Sura K'uchu
 Uqi Uqini

Mountain passes of Chile
Mountain passes of Bolivia
Mountain passes of the Andes
Bolivia–Chile border crossings
Landforms of Arica y Parinacota Region
Landforms of Oruro Department